Nancy Anne Sakovich (born October 8, 1961) is a Canadian actress and former model.

Life and career
Sakovich grew up in Ottawa, Ontario, and attended Laurentian High School.She began modeling locally as a teenager. 
In 1981, she started studying at Trent University (Ontario) and earned a degree in biology. 
Discovered by the Elite Modeling Agency, she traveled the world as an international model, moving first to New York, then settling in Europe where for three years she graced covers and runways in Germany, Italy, France and England. 
Back in Canada, she appeared on various TV commercials, including Jamieson Vitamins and a series of commercials for the Canadian Imperial Bank of Commerce.

After modeling, Sakovich turned to acting. She did a commercial for a large auto maker, and began doing guest roles for TV shows like CBC's Street Legal. She quickly landed roles in variety of TV productions, including a title role in Golden Will: The Silken Laumann Story, recurring roles on TV shows Katts and Dog, Relic Hunter, and Doc, and a major secondary role in Category 6: Day of Destruction.
She also presented the 10th Gemini Awards(1996) as a host, and participated in the MPICA's "Light, Camera, Auction" annual charity event in 2002.
Sakovich is most famous for her role as the series lead, senior data analyst Lindsay Donner, in the TV series Psi Factor: Chronicles of the Paranormal.

She now lives in Toronto, Ontario.

Partial filmography

References

External links
 
 Nancy Anne Sakovich

Living people
Canadian television actresses
Female models from Ontario
1961 births
People from Belleville, Ontario
Actresses from Ontario
Trent University alumni